Aposcopolamine (apohyoscine) is a bio-active isolate of Datura ferox and several species of Physochlaina, - plants belonging to the Nightshade family, Solanaceae in which tropane alkaloids are of frequent occurrence, particularly in tribes Datureae and Hyoscyameae.

See also 
Hydroxyzine
Isovoacristine
Umbelliferone

References

Tropane alkaloids
Epoxides